This is a list of buildings and structures in Hong Kong, in alphabetical order.

Sports venues
 Hong Kong Coliseum
 Hong Kong Stadium
 Kai Tak Sports Park
 Mong Kok Stadium
 Queen Elizabeth Stadium

Shopping malls
 Apm (Hong Kong)
 Discovery Park (Hong Kong)
 Harbour City (Hong Kong)
 K11 Musea
 Langham Place
 New Town Plaza
 Pacific Place (Hong Kong)
 The Landmark (Hong Kong)
 Times Square (Hong Kong)

Hotels
 Conrad Hong Kong
 Cordis Hong Kong
 Four Seasons Hotel Hong Kong
 Grand Hyatt Hong Kong
 Hotel Icon (Hong Kong)
 Hyatt Regency Hong Kong, Tsim Sha Tsui
 Hyatt Regency Hong Kong, Sha Tin
 Island Shangri-La
 JW Marriott Hotel Hong Kong
 Kerry Hotel Hong Kong
 Kowloon Shangri-La 
 Landmark Mandarin Oriental
 Le Meridien Cyberport Hotel
 Mandarin Oriental (formerly Queens Building)
 Panda Hotel
 Rosewood Hong Kong
 St. Regis Hong Kong
 The Peninsula Hong Kong
 The Ritz-Carlton, Hong Kong
 The Upper House Hotel Hong Kong
 W Hong Kong

Office buildings
 AIA Tower
 Bank of America Tower
 Bank of China Tower
 Central Plaza
 Cheung Kong Centre
 Cityplaza
 Cyberport
 Exchange Square (Hong Kong) (Exchange Square One, Two and Three)
 Hong Kong Convention and Exhibition Centre
 Hopewell Centre
 HSBC Hong Kong headquarters building
 Hysan Place
 Lippo Centre
 Murray House
 Pacific Place
 Standard Chartered Bank Building
 International Commerce Centre
 International Finance Centre (1 and 2)
 Manulife Plaza
 Prince's Building
 Shui On Centre
 Taikoo Place
 The Center
 Wing On House
 World-Wide House

Places of worship

 Chi Lin Nunnery
 Man Mo Temple, Sheung Wan
 Po Lin Monastery
 St. John's Cathedral
 Pak Tai Temple, Wan Chai
 Wong Tai Sin Temple

Others
 AsiaWorld-Expo
 Central Police Station
 Chinese People's Liberation Army Forces Hong Kong Building (formerly the Prince of Wales Building)
 Chungking Mansions
 The Cullinan
 Flagstaff House, housing the Flagstaff House Museum of Tea Ware
 Government House
 The Harbourside
 Hong Kong Academy for Performing Arts
 Hong Kong China Temple
 Hong Kong Convention and Exhibition Centre
 Hong Kong International Trade and Exhibition Center
 Hong Kong Visual Arts Centre
 Jardine House
 Legislative Council of Hong Kong (former Supreme Court Building)
 Liaison Office of the Central People's Government
 Nan Lian Garden
 Prince of Wales Hospital
 Tian Tan Buddha
 Tung Chung Fort
 Tung Wah Group of Hospitals Museum
 Union Square
 Victoria Dockside
 Yiu Tung Public Library

See also

:Category:Apartment buildings in Hong Kong
:Category:bridges in Hong Kong
:Category:piers in Hong Kong
:Category:public housing estates in Hong Kong
:Category:shopping centres in Hong Kong
Declared monuments of Hong Kong
Hong Kong International Airport
Hong Kong-Zhuhai-Macau Bridge 
Kai Tak Airport, former Hong Kong International Airport
Kowloon Walled City
List of hospitals in Hong Kong
List of district police stations in Hong Kong
List of MTR stations
List of the oldest buildings and structures in Hong Kong
List of schools in Hong Kong
List of universities in Hong Kong
List of tallest buildings in Hong Kong
Museums in Hong Kong
Tunnels and bridges in Hong Kong
List of cities with most skyscrapers

References 
 Emporis.com

 

es:Anexo:Rascacielos en Hong Kong